State Trunk Highway 47 (often called Highway 47, STH-47 or WIS 47) is a  state highway in the northeastern and northern parts of the US state of Wisconsin that runs in a diagonal northwest–southeast from  Menasha to Manitowish.

Route description

The southern terminus of WIS 47 is at WIS 114 at the corner of Third and De Pere streets in Menasha.

From south to north, WIS 47 is aligned with WIS 29 from south of Bonduel to south of Shawano, WIS 55 from south of Bonduel to Keshena. After a solo segment, WIS 47 follows US Highway 45 (US 45) from south of Antigo to Monico and US 8 from Monico to Rhinelander.

The northern terminus of WIS 47 is a combined terminus with WIS 182 at US 51 in Manitowish.

History
At its inception, WIS 47 ran from WIS 15 in Appleton to WIS 29 in Bonduel. In 1919, the highway was expanded north to Antigo, where it ended at US 45. In 1925, it was extended along US 45 to Woodruff. In 1937, it was extended along the old US 41 to Menasha. In 1952, it was extended north to Manitowish. In 1997, freeway was added with the WIS 29/WIS 55 bypass near Bonduel.

Major intersections

See also

References

External links

047
Transportation in Winnebago County, Wisconsin
Transportation in Outagamie County, Wisconsin
Transportation in Shawano County, Wisconsin
Transportation in Menominee County, Wisconsin
Transportation in Langlade County, Wisconsin
Transportation in Oneida County, Wisconsin
Transportation in Vilas County, Wisconsin
Transportation in Iron County, Wisconsin